The West Two River (Vermilion Lake) is a river of Minnesota.

See also
List of rivers of Minnesota

References
Minnesota Watersheds
USGS Geographic Names Information Service
USGS Hydrologic Unit Map - State of Minnesota (1974)

Rivers of Minnesota